Approximately 7,000–12,000 Roma  live in Slovenia. They constitute 0.5 percent of the total population. The Slovenia Roma speak Balkan Romani and Italian. Only elderly Roma are still able to speak Slovenian. According to the 2002 census, there were 3,246 Romani individuals living in Slovenia.

Background
The Romani people originate from Northern India, presumably from the northwestern Indian states Rajasthan and Punjab.

References

Romani in Slovenia